Mitin is a Russian masculine surname, its feminine counterpart is Mitina. The surname is derived from Mitya, a diminutive of the male given name Dmitry, and literally means Mitya's. It may refer to

Aleksei Mitin (born 1973), Russian footballer
Darya Mitina (born 1973), Russian politician, historian and cinema critic
Mark Borisovich Mitin (1901-1987), Soviet Marxist-Leninist philosopher and university lecturer
Sergey Anatolyevich Mitin (born 1980), Russian footballer
Sergey Gerasimovich Mitin (born 1951), Russian politician
Viktoria Mitina, Russian politician

Russian-language surnames